Stig Olav Larsen (born 26 September 1973) is a Norwegian former football player.

Playing for Fana IL, he was loaned to Hartlepool United in December 1997, playing four league games and one Football League Trophy game, all as a substitute.

References

1973 births
Living people
Norwegian footballers
Fana IL players
Hartlepool United F.C. players
Expatriate footballers in England
Footballers from Bergen
Norwegian expatriate footballers

Association football forwards